, or simply , was a Japanese film studio.  It was active from June 1970 to August 1971.

History 
In the late 1960s Daiei Film began to experience financial problems; in June 1970 Daiei and Nikkatsu merged to share distribution costs to combat financial problems and formed Dainichi Eihai. The partnership between Daiei and Nikkatsu lasted until August 1971, when Nikkatsu withdrew from the deal leaving Daiei Film to face bankruptcy, the company later was purchased Tokuma Shoten in 1974 and later was re-purchased by Kadokawa Shoten Publishing creating Kadokawa Daiei Studio.

Filmography 
 Blind Woman's Curse (1970)
Zatoichi Goes to the Fire Festival (1970)
 Blood For Blood (1971)
 Gokuraku bozu (1971)
 Wet Sand in August (1971)
 Gamera vs. Zigra (1971)
 Suzunosuke Akado: The Birdman with Three Eyes (1958; 1971 re-release)
 Zatoichi and the One-Armed Swordsman (1971)
 Kanto Destruction (1971)
 Kimi wa umi o mita ka (1971)
 Hiroku Nagasaki onna-ro (1971)
 Hiding-Place in the Storm (1971)
 Yoru no shinsatsushitsu (1971)
 Games (1971)

References

External links 

 Laputa Asagaya / Dainichi Eihai Nostalgia (Screened in 2007) Retrieved May 18, 2021 (in Japanese)
 Dainichi Eihai on Japanese Cinema Database (in Japanese)
1970 establishments in Japan
Japanese film studios
Former Kadokawa Corporation subsidiaries